The Ministry of Defence of Mongolia is a ministry of the Government of Mongolia. According to the Law on the Defence of Mongolia, the Ministry is responsible for developing Defence Policy, coordinating its political, economic, social, legal and military implementation, and exercise civilian control over the Mongolian Armed Forces. The current Minister Gürsediin Saikhanbayar was appointed in July 2020.

The ministry has the following leadership structure:
 Minister of Defence
 Deputy Minister of Defence
 Secretary of State

According to the Law on the Armed forces, the General Staff of the Mongolian Armed Forces is the professional managing body and the headquarters for the Mongolian Armed Forces and operates under the policies approved by the Ministry of Defence. The policies are also approved by the Government cabinet and the Parliament  "Ikh Khural" of Mongolia.

History
On 29 December 1911, Mongolia gained independence from the Manchu Empire, and established its first five ministries. One of the ministries was the Ministry of Military Affairs, which was one of the predecessors to the Ministry of Defence.

Since then, it has operated under the following names:

 Ministry of Military Affairs (1911-1919)
 Ministry of War (1921-1922)
 Ministry of Military Affairs of the People's Government of Mongolia (1922-1924)
 Ministry of Military Affairs of People's Republic of Mongolia (1924-1949)
 Ministry of Defence (1949-1955)
 Ministry of Military and Public Security (1955-1959)
 Ministry of People's Military Affairs (1959-1968)
 Ministry of Defence of the Mongolian People's Republic (1968-1992)
 Ministry of Defence of Mongolia (1992-Present)

Ministry structure
The ministry has the following structure:

Strategic Policy and Implementation Directorate
Public Administration Directorate
Policy Implementation Coordination Directorate
Foreign Cooperation Directorate
Monitoring Evaluation and Internal Auditing Directorate

Subordinate institutions/units
The following units/institutions are under the direct command of the Ministry of Defence:
National Defense University – The MNDU is an accredited military university located in Ulaanbaatar and is the country's premier and oldest military educational institution. It prepares officers and NCOs to have grounded leadership skills as well as physical/moral strength.
Institute for Strategic Studies – The institute was established in February 1990 as a strategic research centre under the Ministry of Defence. In May 2006, the government upgraded the institute's status to a separate research branch of the National Security Council of Mongolia (NSC), acting as a think tank institution.
Cultural institutions/units
Mongolian Military Song and Dance Academic Ensemble
Mongolian Military Museum
Central Archives – The Central Archives has data and documents which date back to the Mongolian Revolution of 1921. The military archives were set up by the Deputy Minister on 8 May 1939, coming into effect on 20 October. In the late 1950s, the government took concrete action to improve the orderly use of the preservation of the country's archives. In 1956, the Ministry of Defence appointed a spokesperson for the archives of the Mongolian People's Army. In the early 1980s, the Mongolian People's Army Central Archives was equipped with personnel who have professional and vocational training and an advanced post-secondary education and in 1988, a new building was created due to the expansion of the archives. Since 2006, it has been under the control of the defence ministry.
"Baga Bayan" Peace Resort – Established in 1932, it is a living centre and retirement home for elderly veterans of military service.
State Department Store of the Ministry of Defence "Börte"

List of Ministers of Defence

Since July 1996, the ministry has been led by a civilian official.

Bogd Khanate

Mongolian People's Republic

Modern era

References 

Government ministries of Mongolia
Military of Mongolia
1911 establishments in Mongolia
Mongolia